Youth is a 2013 Israeli - German drama film written and directed by Tom Shoval.

Cast
 Eitan Cunio - Shaul Cooper
 David Cunio - Yaki Cooper
 Moshe Ivgy - Moti Cooper
 Shirli Deshe - Paula Cooper
 Gita Amely - Dafna Edelman

References

External links
 

2013 films
German drama films
2010s Hebrew-language films
2013 drama films
Israeli drama films
2010s German films